Botir Avia was an airline based in Kyrgyzstan.

The airline was on the List of air carriers banned in the European Union.

Fleet 
The Botir-Avia fleet included the following aircraft (at August 2006):

1 Ilyushin Il-76MD Candid
2 Ilyushin Il-76TD Candid

References

External links

Defunct airlines of Kyrgyzstan
Airlines established in 2000
Airlines disestablished in 2006